Augie Vander Meulen (November 6, 1909 – December 2, 1993) was an American professional basketball player. Vander Meulen played in the National Basketball League for the Oshkosh All-Stars.

References

1909 births
1993 deaths
Amateur Athletic Union men's basketball players
American men's basketball players
Basketball players from Wisconsin
Carroll Pioneers baseball players
Carroll Pioneers men's basketball players
Centers (basketball)
High school basketball coaches in the United States
Oshkosh All-Stars players
Basketball players from Chicago